Gangadharbar is a village in Egra II CD block in Egra subdivision of Purba Medinipur district in the state of West Bengal, India.

Geography

Location

Urbanisation
96.96% of the population of Egra subdivision live in the rural areas. Only 3.04% of the population live in the urban areas, and that is the lowest proportion of urban population amongst the four subdivisions in Purba Medinipur district.

Note: The map alongside presents some of the notable locations in the subdivision. All places marked in the map are linked in the larger full screen map.

Demographics
As per 2011 Census of India Gangadharbar had a total population of 1,392 of which 709 (51%) were males and 683 (49%) were females. Population below 6 years was 164. The total number of literates in Gangadharbar was 1,101 (89.66% of the population over 6 years).

Transport
Gangadharbar is on the Pratapdighi-Jinandapur Road.

Healthcare
Gangadharbar Rural Hospital at Gangadharbar, PO Pirijkhanbar (with 30 beds) is the main medical facility in Egra II CD block. There are primary health centres at Paniparul (with 10 beds), Betamaheshpur, PO Maheshpur (with 10 beds) and Shyampur, PO Bidurpur (with 2 beds).

References

Villages in Purba Medinipur district